Martin Luther King Sr. (born Michael King; December 19, 1899 – November 11, 1984) was an African-American Baptist pastor, missionary, and an early figure in the Civil Rights Movement. He was the father and namesake of the civil rights leader Martin Luther King Jr.

Biography
Martin Luther King was born Michael King in Stockbridge, Georgia, the son of Delia (née Linsey; 1875–1924) and James Albert King (1864–1933).

Martin Luther King was a member of the Baptist Church and decided to become a preacher after being inspired by ministers who were prepared to stand up for racial equality. He was boarding with Reverend A.D. Williams, then pastor of the Ebenezer Baptist Church. After King started courting Williams' daughter, Alberta, her family encouraged him to finish his education and to become a preacher. King completed his high school education at Bryant Preparatory School, and began to preach in several black churches in Atlanta.

In 1926, King started his ministerial degree at the Morehouse School of Religion. On Thanksgiving Day in 1926, after eight years of courtship, he married Alberta in the Ebenezer Church. The couple had three children in four years: a daughter, Willie Christine King (born 1927), Martin Luther King Jr. (born Michael King Jr., 1929–1968), and a second son, Alfred Daniel Williams King (1930–1969).

King became leader of the Ebenezer Baptist Church in March 1931 after the death of Williams. With the country in the midst of the Great Depression, church finances were struggling, but King organized membership and fundraising drives that restored these to health. By 1934, King had become a widely respected leader of the local church.  That year, he also changed his name (and that of his eldest son) from Michael King to Martin Luther King after a period of gradual transition on his own part. He was inspired during a trip to Germany for that year's meeting of the Baptist World Alliance (BWA). While visiting sites associated with  reformation leader Martin Luther, attendees also witnessed the rise of Nazism. Whilst the BWA conference issued a resolution condemning antisemitism, the senior King gained deepened appreciation for the power of Luther's protest.

King was the pastor of the Ebenezer Baptist Church for four decades, wielding great influence in the black community and earning some degree of respect from the white community. He also broadcast on WAEC, a religious radio station in Atlanta.

He became a local leader of the Civil Rights Movement, serving on the executive committee of the NAACP chapter in Atlanta and the Civic and Political League as an officer. He encouraged his son to become active in the movement.

In his 1950 essay An Autobiography of Religious Development, King Jr. wrote that his father was a major influence on his entering the ministry. He said, "I guess the influence of my father also had a great deal to do with my going in the ministry. This is not to say that he ever spoke to me in terms of being a minister, but that my admiration for him was the great moving factor; He set forth a noble example that I didn't mind following."

King Jr. often recounted that his father frequently sent him to work in the fields. He said that in this way he would gain a healthier respect for his forefathers.

In his autobiography, King Jr. remembered his father leaving a shoe shop because he and his son were asked to change seats. He said, "This was the first time I had seen Dad so furious. That experience revealed to me at a very early age that my father had not adjusted to the system, and he played a great part in shaping my conscience. I still remember walking down the street beside him as he muttered, 'I don't care how long I have to live with this system, I will never accept it.

Another story related by King Jr. was that once the car his father was driving was stopped by a police officer, and the officer addressed the senior King as "boy". King pointed to his son, saying, "This is a boy, I'm a man; until you call me one, I will not listen to you."

King Jr. became an associate pastor at Ebenezer in 1948, and his father wrote a letter of recommendation for him to attend the Crozer Theological Seminary in Chester, Pennsylvania. King Sr. also made arrangement for King Jr. to work with J. Pius Barbour, a family friend who pastored at Calvary Baptist Church in Chester. Despite theological differences, father and son would later serve together as joint pastors at the church.

King was a major figure in the Civil Rights Movement in Georgia, where he rose to become the head of the NAACP in Atlanta and the Civic and Political League. He led the fight for equal teachers' salaries in Atlanta. He also played an instrumental role in ending Jim Crow laws in the state. King had refused to ride on Atlanta's bus system since the 1920s after a vicious attack on black passengers with no action against those responsible. King stressed the need for an educated, politically active black ministry.

In October 1960, when King Jr. was arrested at a peaceful sit-in in Atlanta, Robert F. Kennedy, brother and aide to the Democratic presidential nominee John F. Kennedy, telephoned the judge and helped secure his release. Although King Sr. had previously opposed John Kennedy because he was a Catholic, he expressed his appreciation for these calls and switched his support to Kennedy. Until this time, King Sr. had been a lifelong registered Republican, and had endorsed Republican Richard Nixon before switching to endorse Kennedy.

King Jr. soon became a popular civil rights activist. Taking inspiration from Mahatma Gandhi of India, he led nonviolent protests in order to win greater rights for African Americans.

King Jr. was shot and killed in 1968 by James Earl Ray. King Sr.'s youngest son, Alfred Daniel Williams King, died under mysterious circumstances that authorities labeled an accidental drowning on July 21, 1969, nine days before his 39th birthday.

In 1969, King was one of several members of the Morehouse College board of trustees held hostage on the campus by a group of students demanding reform in the school's curriculum and governance. One of the students was Samuel L. Jackson, who was suspended for his actions. Jackson subsequently became an actor and Academy Award nominee.

King played a notable role in the nomination of Jimmy Carter as the Democratic candidate for president in the 1976 election. After Carter's success in the Iowa caucus, the New Hampshire primary and the Florida primary, some liberal Democrats were worried about his success and began an "ABC" ("Anyone But Carter") movement to try to head off his nomination. King pointed to Carter's leadership in ending the era of segregation in Georgia and helping to repeal laws restricting voting which especially disenfranchised African Americans. With King's support, Carter continued to build a coalition of black and white voters and win the nomination. King delivered the invocation at the 1976 and 1980 Democratic National Conventions.

Murder of wife 
King Sr.'s wife and King Jr.'s mother, Alberta, was murdered by Marcus Wayne Chenault on Sunday, June 30, 1974, at the Ebenezer Baptist Church during Sunday services. Chenault was a 23-year-old black man from Ohio who stood up and yelled, "You are serving a false god", and fired his gun while Alberta was playing "The Lord's Prayer" on the church organ.  Upon capture, the assassin disclosed that his intended target was Martin Luther King Sr., who was elsewhere that Sunday. After failing to see King Sr., he instead targeted Alberta King and Rev. Edward Boykin. Chenault stated that he was driven to murder after concluding that "black ministers were a menace to black people" and that "all Christians are his enemies".

Later life 
With his son's widow, Coretta Scott King, King was present when President Carter awarded a Presidential Medal of Freedom to King Jr. posthumously in 1977. In 1980, he published his autobiography. 

King died of a heart attack at the Crawford W. Long Hospital in Atlanta on November 11, 1984, at the age of 84. He was interred next to his wife Alberta at the South-View Cemetery in Atlanta.

See also

 Martin Luther King III, one of King's grandsons

References

Further reading
 David Collins (1986) Not Only Dreamers: the story of Martin Luther King Sr. and Martin Luther King Jr. (Elgin, Ill: Brethren Press) 
 Rev. Martin Luther King Sr. (1980) Daddy King: an Autobiography (New York: William Morrow & Co.) 
 Mary-Anne Coupell (1985) Martin Luther King Jr.'s Whole Life,  (Beijing: Brethren Press)
 Murray M. Silver, Esq. (2009) Daddy King and Me: Memories of the Forgotten Father of the Civil Rights Movement,  (Savannah, Ga., Continental Shelf Publishers)

External links

1899 births
1984 deaths
20th-century Baptist ministers from the United States
Activists for African-American civil rights
African-American Baptist ministers
Dillard University alumni
Georgia (U.S. state) Republicans
Martin Luther Sr.
Morehouse College alumni
Clergy from Atlanta
People from Stockbridge, Georgia
Activists from Atlanta
Burials at South-View Cemetery